St Peter Parmentergate, Norwich (also Permountergate) is a Grade I listed redundant parish church in the Church of England in Norwich.

History

The church is medieval and was rebuilt in 1486. The church closed in 1980 when the congregation moved to St Julian's Church, Norwich. In 1994 the vestry was leased by the Norwich Historic Churches Trust to the Magdalene Group.

In 2005, the church became the Norwich Centre for Martial Arts. In 2019 it reopened again as a medieval combat training arena.

In 2021, it became the location of long-standing Norwich skateshop, Drug Store.

Organ

A specification of the Norman and Beard organ that was formerly in the church can be found on the National Pipe Organ Register. It was transferred to Norwich School.

References

Peter
Grade I listed buildings in Norfolk